Mikhail Sergeevich Igolnikov (born 15 October 1996) is a Russian judoka.  Igolnikov competes at the -90kg category, representing Russia and is currently a two-time European Champion; winning his first European title in 2018, and second in 2020.

Background
Igolnikov is a student in physical culture and sports at Kuban State University and is a lieutenant in the Russian special forces.

Accomplishments in Judo

2014
 U21 World Championships, Fort Lauderdale
2015
 U21 European Championships, Oberwart
2016
 U21 European Championships, Málaga
2017
 Grand Prix, Tbilisi
 U23 European Championships, Podgorica
2018
 Grand Slam, Düsseldorf
 Grand Slam, Abu Dhabi
 Senior European Championships, Tel Aviv
 World Masters, Guangzhou
2019
 Grand Slam, Düsseldorf
2020
 Grand Slam, Budapest
 Senior European Championships, Prague

References

External links
 

Russian male judoka
1996 births
People from Tuapse
Living people
Youth Olympic gold medalists for Russia
Judoka at the 2014 Summer Youth Olympics
Judoka at the 2020 Summer Olympics
Olympic judoka of Russia
Sportspeople from Krasnodar Krai
21st-century Russian people